Uhlenbach is a river of Saxony-Anhalt, Germany. It is a left tributary of the Selke.

In its upper course, it is called Kleiner Uhlenbach.

See also
List of rivers of Saxony-Anhalt

Rivers of Saxony-Anhalt
Rivers of Germany